Joseph Pratt may refer to:

Joseph Marmaduke Pratt (1891–1946), American politician
Joseph Gaither Pratt (1910–1979), American parapsychologist

See also
Harcourt Joseph Pratt (1866–1934), American politician